Christ Church Cathedral is the cathedral of the Anglican diocese of Oxford, which consists of the counties of Oxfordshire, Buckinghamshire and Berkshire. It is also the chapel of Christ Church, a college of the University of Oxford. This dual role as cathedral and college chapel is unique in the Church of England.

History

The cathedral was originally the church of St Frideswide's Priory. The site was historically presumed to be the location of the nunnery founded by St Frideswide, the patron saint of Oxford, and the shrine is now in the Latin Chapel; originally containing relics translated at the rebuilding in 1180, it was the focus of pilgrimage from at least the 12th until the early 16th century.

In 1522, the priory was surrendered to Cardinal Thomas Wolsey, who had selected it as the site for his proposed college. However, in 1529 the foundation was taken over by Henry VIII. Work stopped, but in June 1532 the college was refounded by the King. In 1546, Henry VIII transferred to it the recently created See of Oxford from Osney. The cathedral has the name of Ecclesia Christi Cathedralis Oxoniensis, given to it by Henry VIII's foundation charter.

There has been a choir at the cathedral since 1526, when John Taverner was the organist and also master of the choristers. The statutes of Wolsey's original college, initially called Cardinal College, mentioned 16 choristers and 30 singing priests.

Christ Church Cathedral is one of the smallest cathedrals in the Church of England.

The nave, choir, main tower and transepts are late Norman. There are architectural features ranging from Norman to the Perpendicular style and a large rose window of the ten-part (i.e., botanical) type.

Dean and chapter
As of 1 December 2020:
Dean – vacant
Sub-dean – Richard Peers (since 1 September 2020 installation)
Archdeacon of Oxford – Jonathan Chaffey (since 1 May 2020 collation)
Diocesan canon – Sally Welch (from summer 2022)

The university's four senior theology professors are also ex officio canons residentiary:
Regius Professor of Divinity – Graham Ward (since 2012)
Lady Margaret Professor of Divinity – Carol Harrison (lay; since 27 April 2015 installation)
Regius Professor of Moral and Pastoral Theology – vacant
Regius Professor of Ecclesiastical History – Sarah Foot (since 6 October 2007 installation; ordained 2017)

There are also other full-time clergy of the cathedral and college, including the college chaplain, school chaplain and precentor.

Music

Organ
The organ is a 43-rank, four-manual and pedal instrument built in 1979 by Austrian firm Rieger Orgelbau.

Organists
 
First among the notable organists of Christ Church Cathedral is the Renaissance composer John Taverner, who was appointed as the first organist by Wolsey in 1526. Other organists (and directors of the choir) have included Basil Harwood, Thomas Armstrong, W. H. Harris, Simon Preston, Francis Grier, Nicholas Cleobury and Stephen Darlington. The post of organist is currently held by Steven Grahl. (As in many English cathedrals, the organist is also director of the choir and much of the organ playing is delegated to the sub-organist or organ scholar.)

Choirs
The main choir, the Christ Church Cathedral Choir, is directed by Steven Grahl and consists of twelve adults (six professional "lay-clerks" and six student "academical clerks") and sixteen choristers (boys aged 7–13 from Christ Church Cathedral School). The choir was all male until 2019, when they welcomed alto Elizabeth Nurse as its first female clerk. They sing in university term time, at Christmas and Easter, and have an extensive touring and recording programme. Former choristers include the composer William Walton.

The Cathedral Singers consists of volunteers and is currently directed by Hilary Punnett. They are usually in residence outside of term time when the choristers and academical clerks of the main choir are on holiday.

The College Choir sings every 1–2 weeks in term time and is made up of current undergraduates and postgraduates from the college.

Since September 2019, the cathedral has also had a choir for girls aged 7–14 called Frideswide Voices. The choristers are drawn from schools around Oxford, and sing Evensong once a week. The choir is directed by Helen Smee.

Bells 
The cathedral has a ring of 12 bells hung for full circle ringing. The tenor weighs , diameter  tuned to D.  It was cast in 1589 and is historically important according to the Church Buildings Council.

As well as the bells used for ringing there are also two other bells.  The litany bell of 1410 is also historically important.  It weighs  and sounds the note of G.  The Bourdon bell is Great Tom.  This dates from 1680, weighs , diameter  sounding A.  Great Tom is only swung "on a very small number of occasions", but it is sounded every night.

Notable burials

 John Bankes (1589–1644), English lawyer and politician 
 Robert Burton, author The Anatomy of Melancholy
 George Berkeley, philosopher and Bishop of Cloyne (memorial in the nave)
 Sir Thomas Byron, Royalist officer in the First English Civil War
 John Fell, Bishop of Oxford
 Henry Gage (1593–1645) (buried in the Lucy Chapel, off the south transept)
  Richard Gardiner (1591–1670)
 Henry Liddell, father of Alice Liddell
 John Locke, philosopher
 Lady Elizabeth Montacute (d. August 1354)
 Edward Bouverie Pusey
 George Stewart, 9th Seigneur d'Aubigny, cavalier
 Thomas Strong, Bishop of Oxford
 John Underhill  (c.1545–1592), Bishop of Oxford
 John Urry, literary editor
 Peter Wyche, ambassador to the Ottoman Empire and member of the Privy Council

Gallery

See also
List of cathedrals in the United Kingdom
Christ Church, Oxford: more information on the college and the cathedral
Christ Church Cathedral School
The Clerks of Christ Church
Bishop of Oxford
Diocese of Oxford 
Architecture of the medieval cathedrals of England 
List of Gothic Cathedrals in Europe
English Gothic architecture 
English Gothic stained glass windows
Romanesque architecture
ChristChurch Cathedral in New Zealand inspired by the Oxford cathedral

References

External links

Christ Church Cathedral website
Christ Church Cathedral Choir website
Oxford Cathedral information
A history of the choristers of Christ Church Cathedral, Oxford
Sacred destinations photo gallery

Oxford
Chapels of the University of Oxford
Cathedral
Church of England church buildings in Oxford
Oxford
Grade I listed buildings in Oxford
Oxford
Oxford, Christ Church
History of Oxford
English churches with Norman architecture
Towers in Oxford
Tourist attractions in Oxford
Burial sites of the Lyttelton family